Underground Communique Records is an American independent record label based in Chicago, Illinois. Launched in late December 2003, the label includes punk rock, indie rock, and ska bands.

Artists

Apocalypse Hoboken
Big D and the Kids Table
Edna's Goldfish
88 Fingers Louie
Four Star Alarm
Mexican Cheerleader
Rollo Tomasi
Shot Baker
The Copyrights
The Honor System
The Methadones
The Pietasters
The Toasters

References

American record labels
Record labels established in 2003